Paillant is a commune in the Miragoâne Arrondissement, in the Nippes department of Haiti.

References

Populated places in Nippes
Communes of Haiti